Ludwig Hujer  (July 2, 1872 - 1968) Austrian sculptor, born in Wilhelmshöhe.  During his career he worked in France and England, as well as in Germany.  He is best known for his bas-reliefs and medallions.

References

External links

1872 births
1968 deaths
Austrian male sculptors
20th-century Austrian sculptors
20th-century Austrian male artists